is a passenger railway station  located in the city of Tottori, Tottori Prefecture, Japan. It is operated by the West Japan Railway Company (JR West).

Lines
Only local trains stop at this station.

Station layout
The station consists of one ground-level island platform connected by a level crossing to the station building.  The station is unattended.

Platforms

History
It was renamed on March 1, 1949. With the privatization of the Japan National Railways (JNR) on April 1, 1987, the station came under the aegis of the West Japan Railway Company.

Passenger statistics
In fiscal 2020, the station was used by an average of 63 passengers daily.

See also
List of railway stations in Japan

References

External links 

 Fukube Station from JR-Odekake.net 

Railway stations in Tottori Prefecture
Sanin Main Line
Railway stations in Japan opened in 1910
Tottori (city)